Skoko is a surname found in Montenegro, Bosnia & Herzegowina, Serbia and Croatia derived from the word skok, meaning "jump". Notable people with the surname include:

Josip Skoko (born 1975), former Australian footballer
Suzana Skoko (born 1971), Croatian sports shooter
Božo Skoko (born 1976), professor of strategic communication at the University of Zagreb 
Savo Skoko (1923-2013), Serbian historian and Yugoslav commander

References
Јевто Дедијер, Херцеговина: антропогеографске студије, „Веселин Маслеша“, Сарајево, 1991. Прво издање изишло је у оквиру етнографског зборника Српске академије наука 1909.

Croatian surnames
Serbian surnames